FC Elektron Veliky Novgorod is a Russian football team based in Veliky Novgorod. It was founded in 2022.

Club history
The club predecessor, FC Elektron Novgorod, played in the Soviet Second League from 1969 to 1977.

The new club was formed in 2022, based on an existing football academy called Elektron, and received a professional license for the 2022–23 season of the Russian Second League.

Current squad
As of 22 February 2023, according to the Second League website.

References

Association football clubs established in 2022
Football clubs in Russia
Sport in Novgorod Oblast
2022 establishments in Russia